Edgar Jones (born June 17, 1956) is a retired American professional basketball player, who had a career in the National Basketball Association (NBA), from 1980 to 1986.

College career 
In his sophomore year of college basketball, with the University of Nevada, Reno, Jones led the school to a 15–12 record, the Nevada Wolf Packs first winning season in eight seasons. During his time playing for the Wolf Pack (1975–79), Jones set the school's all-time total points scored record with 1,877 points; a record which stood until broken by the Wolf Pack's Nick Fazekas, on November 18, 2006. Jones' jersey number 32 was officially retired by the University of Nevada, upon his retirement. He was the first Wolf Pack player to be given that honor.

Professional career
After his graduation from college, Jones was drafted in the second round, with the 31st overall pick of the 1979 NBA Draft, by the Milwaukee Bucks. During his NBA career, he played for teams such as the San Antonio Spurs and the Cleveland Cavaliers. Jones also participated in the 1984 Slam Dunk Contest, in Denver.

Jones also played professionally in the Greek Basket League. He played with the Greek club Panathinaikos Athens, from 1988 to 1990. He also played with the Greek club  Aris Thessaloniki, in the 1991–92 season. With Aris, he won the Greek Cup title in 1992.

See also
List of National Basketball Association players with most blocks in a game

References

External links
 nba.com historical playerfile
 Statistics page for Jones
 thedraftreview.com

1956 births
 Living people
 American expatriate basketball people in Greece
 American expatriate basketball people in Spain
 American men's basketball players
 Aris B.C. players
 Basketball players from Alabama
 CB Peñas Huesca players
Centers (basketball)
 Cleveland Cavaliers players
 Detroit Pistons players
 Lehigh Valley Jets players
 Liga ACB players
 Milwaukee Bucks draft picks
 Nevada Wolf Pack men's basketball players
 New Jersey Nets players
 Panathinaikos B.C. players
 People from Fort Rucker, Alabama
 Power forwards (basketball)
 San Antonio Spurs players
 Yakima Sun Kings players